Nahid Hagigat or Nahid Haghighat is an Iranian-American illustrator and artist, located in New York City. She is well known for her paintings and prints with layered imagery.

Biography
Hagigat was born in 1943 in Iran. She studied at Tehran University and moved to New York to continue her art education at the New York University in 1968. In the early 1970s she studied Fine Arts at New York University (NYU) and met her husband, artist Nicky Nodjoumi while in school. In the 70s she was also "one of the few female artists to address political issues at the time." She has a Ph.D. in Art Education from New York University (NYU) and a Ph.D. from Huntington Pacific University in Behavioral Therapy. Her work is part of the permanent collection at the Metropolitan Museum of Art.

Illustrations 
 Muna, CD/Album cover, music by Markéta Irglová, 2014
 Anar, CD/Album cover, music by Markéta Irglová, 2011
 Half for You, written by M. Azad, 2010
 The Valiant Little Potter, retold by Erick Berry, 1973
 The Story of the Little Robin, written by M. Azad, 1968

Exhibitions 
 2013 – 2014: Iran Modern, Asian Society, New York
 2013: Public Affairs Alliance of Iranian Americans (PAAIA) Gala, San Francisco, California
 2011: Encyclopædia Iranica Exhibition of Iranian Art, Leila Heller Gallery, New York, New York
 2010: One Generation – Seven Artists, Zora Space Gallery, Brooklyn, New York
 1987: An Iranian Couple, Sherkat Gallery, New York, New York

References

Further reading

External links 
 Nahid Hagigat's official website
 Nahid Hagigat on AskArt
 Nahid Hagigat's art work  at The Met

1943 births
Living people
20th-century Iranian women artists
21st-century Iranian women artists
American people of Iranian descent
New York University alumni
Iranian illustrators